German submarine U-211 was a Type VIIC U-boat of the Kriegsmarine during World War II. The submarine was laid down on 29 March 1941 by the Friedrich Krupp Germaniawerft yard at Kiel as yard number 640, launched on 15 January 1942 and commissioned on 7 March under the command of Korvettenkapitän Karl Hause.

A member of eight wolfpacks, she sank one warship of 1,350 tons and damaged three commercial vessels totalling  in five patrols.

She was sunk on 19 November 1943 by a British aircraft in the North Atlantic. 54 men died; there were no survivors.

Design
German Type VIIC submarines were preceded by the shorter Type VIIB submarines. U-211 had a displacement of  when at the surface and  while submerged. She had two shafts and two  propellers.

U-211 was fitted with five  torpedo tubes (four fitted at the bow and one at the stern), fourteen torpedoes, one  SK C/35 naval gun, 220 rounds, and a  C/30 anti-aircraft gun. The boat had a complement of between forty-four and sixty.

Service history

First patrol
Having moved to Bergen via Arendal in Norway in August 1942, U-211s first patrol began from the larger Nordic port on 26 August. Her route took her through the gap between Iceland and the Faroe Islands and into the Atlantic Ocean.

On 12 September, she damaged Empire Moonbeam southwest of Cape Clear, (southern Ireland) with one torpedo and Hektoria with two. This ship had already been unsuccessfully attacked the previous day. There were no survivors.

U-211 arrived at Brest in occupied France on 7 October 1942.

Second patrol
The boat left Brest for her second foray on 11 November 1942. On 17 December, as part of Wolfpack Raufbold she sank a British destroyer, which at the time was on escort duty protecting Convoy ON 153, in mid-Atlantic. The ship broke into two pieces on being hit. The bow sank immediately, but the stern remained afloat for some hours. There were 26 survivors out of a ships' company of 196.

The submarine returned to Brest on 29 December.

Third patrol
All was well on the boat's third sortie until 20 February 1943 when she was attacked by a US B-24 Liberator west of the Bay of Biscay. The aircraft dropped six depth charges, causing enough damage to bring the patrol to a premature end.

Fourth patrol
This time it was the turn of the Royal Air Force. While still outbound, an Armstrong Whitworth Whitley of No. 10 Squadron dropped three depth charges north of Finisterre in Spain on 15 May 1943 - the damage was not so great. Having left Brest on the tenth, U-211 returned on 16 July.

Fifth patrol and loss
U-211 moved from Brest to Lorient in September 1943. On 11 October, she began what would turn out to be her final outing. After a lot of to-ing and fro-ing west of Portugal, she was sunk by depth charges from a British Vickers Wellington of 179 Squadron east of the Azores.

54 men died; there were no survivors.

Wolfpacks
U-211 took part in eight wolfpacks, namely:
 Vorwärts (3 – 26 September 1942) 
 Panzer (27 November – 11 December 1942) 
 Raufbold (11 – 21 December 1942) 
 Trutz (1 – 16 June 1943) 
 Trutz 3 (16 – 29 June 1943) 
 Geier 2 (30 June – 10 July 1943) 
 Schill (25 October – 16 November 1943) 
 Schill 1 (16 – 19 November 1943)

Summary of raiding history

References

Notes

Citations

Bibliography

External links

German Type VIIC submarines
World War II submarines of Germany
World War II shipwrecks in the Atlantic Ocean
U-boats commissioned in 1942
U-boats sunk in 1943
U-boats sunk by British aircraft
1942 ships
Ships built in Kiel
U-boats sunk by depth charges
Ships lost with all hands
Maritime incidents in November 1943